Johnson Township is one of eleven townships in LaGrange County, Indiana. As of the 2010 census, its population was 3,392 and it contained 2,080 housing units.

Johnson Township was founded in 1837.

Geography

References

External links
 Indiana Township Association
 United Township Association of Indiana

Townships in LaGrange County, Indiana
Townships in Indiana